Andrew Smellie Anderson (21 February 1909 – 18 August 1991) was a Scottish footballer who played for Heart of Midlothian and the Scotland national team.

Anderson, a right back born in Airdrie, joined Hearts in 1929 from Baillieston Juniors and remained with the Edinburgh club for the remainder of his career, retiring in 1941 at the age of 32, although his last competitive appearances were prior to the outbreak of World War II in 1939. Including all cups and wartime tournaments, he made 497 appearances for the club, with 354 of those in the Scottish Football League and Scottish Cup. He never won a major honour, the closest he got being three Scottish Cup semi-final defeats and a runners-up finish in the league in 1937–38, three points behind winners Celtic.

He won 23 caps for Scotland between 1933 and 1938 (also participating in an SFA tour of North America in 1935) and four caps for the Scottish League XI.

Anderson's brother-in-law Jock White, also an Airdrie man, played for Hearts and Scotland several years before Anderson. White returned to Hearts from Leeds United in 1930 and the two played together for four seasons.

After his playing retirement, Anderson worked as a joiner.

See also
List of Scotland national football team captains

References

External links 

1909 births
1991 deaths
Scottish Football League players
Scottish footballers
Scotland international footballers
Heart of Midlothian F.C. players
Association football fullbacks
Scottish Football League representative players
Footballers from Airdrie, North Lanarkshire
Baillieston Juniors F.C. players
Scottish Junior Football Association players